The overlook spiny pocket mouse (Heteromys catopterius) is a species of heteromyid rodent endemic to Venezuela.

References

Heteromys
Fauna of Venezuela
Mammals described in 2009